Songjiang South railway station is a railway station on the Shanghai–Hangzhou high-speed railway located in Shanghai, China.

With the construction of the Shanghai-Suhu Railway Station in Songjiang and the upgrading of Songjiang South Station to the "Songjiang Hub" in 2024, the scale of the high-speed rail will be expanded from the current plan of 2 platforms and 4 tracks to 9 platforms and 23 tracks, second only to Hongqiao Station (16 tracks and 30 platforms) and the under construction Shanghai East railway station (14 platforms and 30 tracks), the third largest high-speed railway station in Shanghai. The scale of the Songjiang hub station building will be approximately 60,000 square meters on the line, and it is predicted that the passenger flow in the future will be about 20 million or more per year.

The station will serve:
 China Rail
 Shanghai-Suzhou-Hu high-speed rail (under construction, expected opening August 2024)
 Shanghai-Kunming high-speed rail
 Shanghai-Kunming-Pu high-speed rail
 Shanghai Metropolitan Area Intercity Railway
 East-west connection line (planned)
 Jiaqing Songjin line (planned)
 Shanghai metro: 
 Metro Line 9 
 Metro Line 23 (planned)
 Songjiang Tram: 
Tram line T3, which connects Songjiang New City and surrounding town nodes

History
The station opened on 26 October 2010.

References

External links

Railway stations in Shanghai
Railway stations in China opened in 2010